Leigh Wardell is an Australian former soccer player who played for the Australia women's national soccer team between 1978 and 1988. Wardell was inducted into the Football Federation Australia Hall of Fame in May 2019.

References

Australian women's soccer players
Australia women's international soccer players
Living people
Year of birth missing (living people)
Women's association footballers not categorized by position